Alexandra Gallagher (born 1980) is a British multidisciplinary artist. She creates paintings, collages, print, and digital and street art.

Early and personal life
Gallagher was born in Lancashire, England. Her father, an art teacher, taught her how to paint. Gallagher started painting portraits, however, she eventually felt limited and restrained. She became interested in surrealism.

Gallagher dropped out of her foundation course at 17 years old. She became a mother at 19. She returned to Blackburn College at 21 years old for a year, juggling responsibilities as a mother and as a student. Gallagher says she struggles with routines.

Art
Gallagher creates mixed media art — often combining painting, photography and digital art. Her works explore the realms of imagination, dreams, memory and experience and subtly contemplates upon notions of feminism, sexuality and identity. Gallagher uses women as subjects and imbues her works with geometric lines and shapes, symbolism from history and different cultures, and objects from the natural world such as flowers, plants and birds.

Gallagher's art is colorful and organic. It is described to be delicate, ethereal and refined. She fuses art nouveau’s ornamentalism and surrealism's dreamlike quality in evoking the subconscious.

Selected works
Drawing in Winter
The Heart and Tongue of Virtue
Melancholy Paradise
Swallow Blind
Our Lady of Sorrows
Sin of Man
The Seventh State of Perfection
Evolution of Camouflage
The Monkey and the Hare
Shepards Delight
Birds with Birds
Carry My Soul to Heaven
Forbidden Fruit

References

1980 births
Living people
21st-century English women artists
English women painters
Artists from Lancashire
British contemporary artists